There are over 20,000 Grade II* listed buildings in England. This page is a list of these buildings in the district of Hastings in East Sussex.

List

|}

Notes

Grade II* listed buildings in East Sussex
Lists of Grade II* listed buildings in East Sussex